The Croatia women's national handball team is the national handball team of Croatia. It is governed by the Croatian Handball Federation and takes part in international team handball competitions.

Results

Olympic Games

World Championship

European Championship

Mediterranean Games
 1993 –  Champions
 1997 –  Runners-up
 2005 –  3rd place
 2009 – 6th place
 2013 –  3rd place
 2018 – Did not participate
 2022 –  Runners-up

Other competitions 
 Carpathian Trophy 1996 – 2rd
 Carpathian Trophy 1999 – 2nd
 Carpathian Trophy 2005 – 3rd
 Carpathian Trophy 2007 – 3rd

Team

Current squad
Squad for the 2022 European Women's Handball Championship.

Head coach: Nenad Šoštarić

Medal-winning squads
 Bronze medal at the 2020 European Championship: Lucija Bešen, Paula Posavec, Dora Krsnik, Stela Posavec, Ćamila Mičijević, Dejana Milosavljević, Larissa Kalaus, Dora Kalaus, Katarina Ježić, Tena Japundža, Andrea Šimara, Ana Debelić, Josipa Mamić, Marijeta Vidak, Valentina Blažević, Kristina Prkačin, Tea Pijević
 coach: Nenad Šoštarić

Notable former players

Klaudija Bubalo 
Snježana Petika
Barbara Stančin
Nataša Kolega
Adriana Prosenjak
Sanela Knezović
Maida Arslanagić
Dijana Jovetić
Jelena Grubišić
Miranda Tatari
Anita Gaće
Lidija Horvat

Maja Zebić
Nikica Pušić-Koroljević
Ivana Lovrić
Andrea Penezić 
Marta Žderić
Vesna Milanović-Litre
Andrea Čović
Ivana Jelčić
Kristina Elez

See also
Croatia men's national handball team
Croatia national beach handball team
Croatia women's national beach handball team

References

External links

IHF profile

National team
Handball
Women's national handball teams